Hakan Bayraktar (born 11 February 1976 in Samsun, Turkey) is a Turkish retired association football midfielder.

He started his professional career in the 1994–95 season, playing for K.F.C. Lommel S.K. in Belgium. He joined Gaziantepspor in 1997, and Fenerbahce in 2001. He also played for Çaykur Rizespor and Kayserispor. In the 2003–04 season, he only played one game and returned to Gaziantepspor for the remainder of the season. In 2004, he joined Akçaabat Sebatspor, playing one season before joining Sivasspor. He joined Malatyaspor in 2007. After a quite good season for the second league team Diyarbakirspor, Bayraktar signed for his former team Gaziantepspor once again. He returned to Belgium to play in the amateur leagues.

He has been capped for Turkey.

References
 
 Profile at TFF.org

External links
 
 Guardian Stats Centre

1976 births
Living people
Turkish footballers
Belgian footballers
Turkey B international footballers
Fenerbahçe S.K. footballers
Sivasspor footballers
Gaziantepspor footballers
Malatyaspor footballers
Kayserispor footballers
Akçaabat Sebatspor footballers
Diyarbakırspor footballers
Samsunspor footballers
Turkey international footballers
Belgian people of Turkish descent
Süper Lig players
K.F.C. Lommel S.K. players
Association football midfielders